Lilia Aguilar Gil (born 17 August 1977) is a Mexican politician affiliated with the PT. She currently serves as Deputy of the LXII Legislature of the Mexican Congress representing Chihuahua.

References

External links

1977 births
Living people
Politicians from Chihuahua (state)
Women members of the Chamber of Deputies (Mexico)
Deputies of the LXII Legislature of Mexico
Labor Party (Mexico) politicians
21st-century Mexican politicians
21st-century Mexican women politicians
Monterrey Institute of Technology and Higher Education alumni
Harvard Kennedy School alumni
Members of the Congress of Chihuahua
People from Ojinaga, Chihuahua
Members of the Chamber of Deputies (Mexico) for Chihuahua (state)